Steve Raines (June 17, 1916 – January 4, 1996) was an American television and film actor.  He appeared in many TV Western series.

Career 
Born in Grants Pass, Oregon, Raines appeared in many television series and several films, including Naked Gun (1956), Street of Darkness (1958), and Macho Callahan (1970). He was the adopted son of Mr. and Mrs Henry Savage of San Antonio, Texas. The Savages had a riding stable across the road from an orphans home where Raines was. He started coming over to the stable and eventually was adopted by the Savages. He and Savage performed in some "B" movies with Henry Garcia a local actor. After a while, he decided he would go to California to be in the movies and the rest is below. 

Raines participated in bulldogging and bronco riding in rodeos in the United States and South America. He also worked as a stuntman in Hollywood and as a guide for hunters. He was in the US military during World War II.
 
Raines played Jim Quince in the CBS western series, Rawhide (1959–1965). Raines was featured in the episode, Judgement at Hondo Seco. From the 1950s to the 1970s, he guest-starred in The Adventures of Kit Carson, Brave Eagle, Maverick, The Life and Legend of Wyatt Earp, Laredo, and The High Chaparral.

His last appearance was in a 1974 episode of CBS's Gunsmoke, starring James Arness.

Filmography

References 
 
Television western players of the fifties: a biographical encyclopedia of, by Everett Aaker''

External links
 

1916 births
1996 deaths
American male television actors
American male film actors
Male actors from Grants Pass, Oregon
Male actors from Los Angeles
20th-century American male actors
Western (genre) television actors